This is a list of films which ranked number one at the weekend box office for the year 2022 in India.

Number-one films

Highest-grossing films

In-Year Release

See also 

 Lists of box office number-one films

References

Notes

Chronology 

United States
2022 in Indian cinema